Minolia is a genus of sea snails, marine gastropod mollusks in the family Solariellidae.

A. Adams named the genus from Mino-Sima, the little island near Niphon (Japan). Minolia was in older textbooks regarded as a subgenus of Margarita Leach, 1819 (itself now a synonym of Margarites Gray, 1847).

Description
The thin, delicate, smooth shell is depressed and widely umbilicated. The whorls are rounded or angulated. The spire is depressed. The sculpture is finely decussated. The aperture  is circular. The outer lip and columella thin, simple, acute. The umbilicus is simple and contains no spiral, callous internal funicle or rib.

Distribution
These marine species belong to the Indian Ocean, the western and southwestern Pacific Ocean.

Species
Species within the genus Minolia include:
 Minolia midwayensis Shikama, 1977
 Minolia nyssonus (Dall, 1919)
 Minolia peramabilis Carpenter, 1864
 Minolia pompiliodes Melvill, 1891 
 Minolia pseudobscura (Yokoyama, 1927):
 Minolia punctata A. Adams, 1860  
 Minolia rotundata (Sowerby III, 1894)   (taxon inquirendum)
 Minolia sakya Nomura, 1940   (taxon inquirendum)
 Minolia shimajiriensis (MacNeil, 1960)
 Minolia strigata (Sowerby III, 1894) 
 Minolia subangulata Kuroda & Habe, 1952 
 Minolia watanabei (Shikama, 1962)

 Taxa inquirenda
 Minolia caifassii Carmagna, 1888:  
 Minolia ceraunia Melvill, 1891  
 Minolia chinensis Sowerby, 1888  (use in recent literature currently undocumented)
 Minolia condei Poppe, Tagaro & Dekker, 2006 
 Minolia edithae Melvill, 1891  
 Minolia gilvosplendens Melvill, 1891   
 Minolia malcolmia Melvill, 1891  

 Species mentioned in the Indo-Pacific Molluscan Database
 Minolia eilikrines Melvill, 1891 (incertae sedis)

Species brought into synonymy
 Subgenus Minolia (Conotrochus) Pilsbry, 1889 represented as Conotrochus Seguenza, 1864 (alternate representation)
 Minolia adarticulata Barnard, 1963: synonym of Spectamen adarticulatum (Barnard, 1963)
 Minolia agapeta Melvill & Standen, 1896: synonym of Parminolia apicina (Gould, 1861)
 Minolia amblia Dall, 1927; synonym of Tegula patagonica (d'Orbigny, 1835) 
 Minolia arata Hedley, 1903: synonym of Minolops arata Hedley, 1903
 Minolia articulata (Gould, 1861): synonym of Pseudominolia articulata (Gould, 1861)
 Minolia bellula Angas, 1869: synonym of Spectamen bellulum (Angas, 1869)
 Minolia biangulosa (A. Adams, 1854): synonym of Pseudominolia biangulosa (A. Adams, 1854)
 Minolia bicarinata (A. Adams & Reeve, 1850): synonym of Ilanga bicarinata (A. Adams & Reeve, 1850)
 Minolia bleeki (Gould, 1861): synonym of Pseudominolia articulata (Gould, 1861)
 Minolia charmosyne Melvill, 1918: synonym of Pseudominolia musiva (Gould, 1861)
 Minolia cincta (Cotton & Godfrey, 1938): synonym of Minolops cincta (Cotton & Godfrey, 1938)
 Minolia cinerea Preston, 1909: synonym of Minolops cinerea (Preston, 1909)
 Minolia climacota Melvill, 1897: synonym of Pseudominolia climacota (Melvill, 1897) 
 Minolia congener G.B. Sowerby, 1903: synonym of Ilanga laevissima (Martens, 1881)
 Minolia dulcis E. A. Smith, 1907: synonym of Antimargarita dulcis (E. A. Smith, 1907) 
 Minolia eucoronata G.B. Sowerby III, 1905: synonym of Ethminolia impressa (G. Nevill & H. Nevill, 1869)
 Minolia eudeli Deshayes, 1863: synonym of Ethminolia eudeli (Deshayes, 1863) (superseded combination)
 Minolia eutyches Melvill, 1918: synonym of Pagodatrochus variabilis (H. Adams, 1873)
 Minolia gemmulata Kuroda & Habe in Kuroda et al., 1971: synonym of Minolia shimajiriensis (MacNeil, 1960) (junior synonym)
 Minolia gertruda Iredale, 1936: synonym of  Minolops gertruda Iredale, 1936
 Minolia glaphyrella Melvill & Standen, 1895: synonym of Ethminolia glaphyrella (Melvill & Standen, 1895)
 Minolia glaucophaos (Barnard, 1963): synonym of Falsimargarita glaucophaos (Barnard, 1963)
 Minolia gradata G.B. Sowerby III, 1895: synonym of Pseudominolia gradata (G. B. Sowerby III, 1895)
 Minolia henniana Melvill, 1891: synonym of Conotalopia henniana (Melvill, 1891)
 Minolia hilarula Yokoyama, 1926: synonym of Conotalopia hilarula (Yokoyama, 1926)
 Minolia holdsworthana (G. Nevill & H. Nevill, 1871): synonym of Pseudominolia musiva (Gould, 1861)
 Minolia holdsworthiana H. Nevill & G. Nevill, 1871: synonym of Isanda holdsworthana (H. Nevill & G. Nevill, 1871)
 Minolia impressa (G. Nevill & H. Nevill, 1869): synonym of Ethminolia impressa (G. Nevill & H. Nevill, 1869)
 Minolia laevissima (Martens, 1881): synonym of Ilanga laevissima (Martens, 1881)
 Minolia lentiginosa (Adams, A., 1853): synonym of Monilea lentiginosa (A. Adams, 1853) 
 Minolia minima Golikov, in Golikov & Scarlato, 1967: synonym of Conotalopia minima (Golikov, 1967)
 Minolia nedyma Melvill, 1897: synonym of Pseudominolia nedyma (Melvill, 1897)
 Minolia ornata G. B. Sowerby III, 1903: synonym of Conotalopia ornata (G. B. Sowerby III, 1903)
 Minolia ornatissima Schepman, 1908: synonym of Solariella ornatissima (Schepman, 1908)
 Minolia pantanelli (Caramagna, 1888): synonym of Monilea pantanellii (Caramagna, 1888)
 Minolia pardalis Herbert, 1987: synonym of Spectamen pardalis Herbert, 1987 
 Minolia peramabilis Carpenter, 1864: synonym of Solariella peramabilis Carpenter, 1864
 Minolia philippensis Watson, 1880: synonym of Solariella philippensis (Watson, 1880)
 Minolia plicatula Murdoch & Suter, 1906: synonym of Solariella plicatula (Murdoch & Suter, 1906)
 Minolia pulcherrima Angas, 1869: synonym of Minolops pulcherrima (Angas, 1869)
 Minolia pulcherrima emendata Iredale, 1924: synonym of Minolops emendata (Iredale, 1924)
 Minolia sculpta (G.B. Sowerby, 1897): synonym of Ethminolia sculpta (G.B. Sowerby, 1897)
 Minolia segersi Poppe, Tagaro & Dekker, 2006: synonym of Solariella segersi (Poppe, Tagaro & Dekker, 2006)
 Minolia sematensis Oyama, 1942: synonym of Conotalopia sematensis (Oyama, 1942)
 Minolia semireticulata (Suter, 1908): synonym of Spectamen semireticulatum (Suter, 1908)
 Minolia singaporensis (Pilsbry, 1889): synonym of Conotalopia singaporensis (Pilsbry, 1889)
 Minolia splendens (G. B. Sowerby, 1897): synonym of Pseudominolia splendens (Sowerby III, 1897)
 Minolia stearnsii Pilsbry, 1895: synonym of Sericominolia stearnsii (Pilsbry, 1895)
 Minolia subplicata Nevill: synonym of Vaceuchelus clathratus (A. Adams, 1853)
 Minolia tabakotanii Poppe, Tagaro & Dekker, 2006: synonym of Zetela tabakotanii (Poppe, Tagaro & Dekker, 2006) (original combination)
 Minolia tasmanica Tenison-Woods, 1876: synonym of Ethminolia vitiliginea (Menke, 1843) 
 Minolia textilis Murdoch & Suter, 1906: synonym of Zetela textilis (Murdoch & Suter, 1906)
 Minolia thielei Hedley, 1916: synonym of Falsimargarita thielei (Hedley, 1916)
 Minolia undata (G.B. Sowerby, 1870): synonym of Ilanga undata undata (G.B. Sowerby, 1870)
 Minolia variabilis H. Adams, 1873: synonym of Pagodatrochus variabilis (H. Adams, 1873)
 Minolia variegata Odhner, 1919: synonym of Pseudominolia splendens (G.B. Sowerby, 1897)

References

 Gofas, S.; Le Renard, J.; Bouchet, P. (2001). Mollusca, in: Costello, M.J. et al. (Ed.) (2001). European register of marine species: a check-list of the marine species in Europe and a bibliography of guides to their identification. Collection Patrimoines Naturels, 50: pp. 180–213

 
Solariellidae
Gastropod genera